Bely Oryol (lit. White Eagle) is a Russian musical band founded in 1996 by a businessman Vladimir Zhechkov. 2001 single of Bely Oryol,

Videos
1997 — «Я тебя теряю» 
1997 — «А я тебя помню»  
1998 — «Потому что нельзя» 
1998 — «Как упоительны в России вечера» 
1998 — «Моя любовь — воздушный шар» 
1998 — «Я по тебе скучаю» 
1998 — «Я куплю тебе новую жизнь» 
1999 — «Боже» 
1999 — «С высоких гор»
2000 — «Без тебя»
2000 — «Добрый вечер, скажу я, мисс»
2001 — «Пташечка» 
2007 — «Я один и ты одна» 
2008 — «Неповторимая»

External links
 Official site

Musical groups established in 1996
Russian musical groups
Russian chanson
Russian rock music groups